Miklós Zelei (8 November 1948 – 28 October 2021) was a Hungarian poet, writer, and journalist.

Biography
Zelei graduated from the University of Szeged in 1973. He then studied at a journalism school and became editor-in-chief of the APN news agency.

His novel, A kettézárt falu, told the story of how this village was split in two.

Zelei died on 28 October 2021, at the age of 72.

Works
Alapítólevél (1980)
Híd (1984)
Szépséghibák (1986)
Ágytörténetek (1988)
A tolvajkulcs (1988)
Tűz is volt, babám! Alapszerv Kárhelyen, 1957-58 (1989)
Őrjítő mandragóra. Bevezetés a politikai pszichiátriába (1989)
Az elrabolt emberöltő (1990)
Hullaciróka (1998)
Itt állunk egy szál megmaradásban (2000)
A kettézárt falu (2000)
Álljon fel! (2003)
A halasi norma (2003)
Hat vita (2005)
A 342-es határkő (2006)
Egyperces évszázad. In memoriam Örkény István novellapályázat / Abszurd flikk-flakk. Grafikai illusztrációk Örkény István szellemében (2012)
Őrjítő mandragóra. Bevezetés a politikai pszichiátriába (2012)
Situs inversus, az Isten balján (2013)
 Az elrabolt emberöltő. Bara Margit, Kahler Frigyes, Mérő László (2014)
A kettézárt falu. Dokumentumregény (2017)
Gyilkos idők. Epikus improvizációk (2020)

References

1948 births
2021 deaths
Hungarian poets
Hungarian writers
Hungarian journalists
University of Szeged alumni
People from Kiskunhalas